The River Ghela, is a river that runs through the town of Gadhada in the Indian state of Gujarat.Ghelo river originates from Jasdan hills (Around Fulzar village, Jasdan Taluka) & meets in Arabian sea. Its length is 118 km. & 622 km2. catchment area. Ghelo Somnath & Ghelo Itaria dams are situated on this river having 60 km2. & 104 km2. catchment area respectively.

It is a significant place of pilgrimage for the followers of Swaminarayan as it is said that Swaminarayan himself had taken a bath in this river several times.

History
The great sage Mandavya Muni started intense penance in the Fulzar forest located near Ghela Somnath. After some years of meditation, Mandavya muni called holy Ganges to appear before him so that he can take bath to finish penance. But Ganges didn't appear before him immediately. In the fit of revenge, Mandavya muni started intense penance to Vamana. Vamana appeared before the great sage and kicked the earth with force to call Ganges. The Ganges appeared deliriously (Unmat) and that's why Ghelo river is also called  Unmat Ganga.

See also
 Shri Swaminarayan Mandir, Gadhada

References
 Rivers flowing through Bhaal Region
 Prasadi items of Swaminarayan
 The river marked on Wikimapia
 Clearwater revival

Rivers of Gujarat
Rivers of India